The Java Telephony API (JTAPI) supports telephony call control. It is an extensible application programming interface (API) designed to scale for use in a range of domains, from first-party call control in a consumer device to third-party call control in large distributed call centers.

External links
JTAPI
Open Source JTAPI Implementation with multiple pluggable service providers

Java APIs